Long Semado Airport  is an airport serving Long Semado in the state of Sarawak in Malaysia. There are no scheduled flights at this airport.

See also

 List of airports in Malaysia

References

External links
 Short Take-Off and Landing Airports (STOL) at Malaysia Airports Holdings Berhad
 

Airports in Sarawak